The 1988 United States presidential election in Hawaii took place on November 8, 1988. All 50 states and the District of Columbia, were part of the 1988 United States presidential election. Hawaii voters chose 4 electors to the Electoral College, which selected the president and vice president.

Hawaii was won by Massachusetts Governor Michael Dukakis who was running against incumbent United States Vice President George H. W. Bush of Texas. Dukakis ran with Texas Senator Lloyd Bentsen as Vice President, and Bush ran with Indiana Senator Dan Quayle.

The election was very partisan for Hawaii, with 99% of the electorate voting for either the Democratic or Republican parties. All four of the Hawaiian island counties voted in majority for Dukakis. Hawaii weighed in for this election as 17% more Democratic than the national average. Dukakis won the election in Hawaii with a solid 10-point win. The election results in Hawaii stand out from most in the United States during this election. The nationwide electoral results are largely reflective of a nationwide political reconsolidation of base for the Republican Party, which took place through the 1980s. Through the passage of some very controversial economic programs, spearheaded by then President Ronald Reagan (called, collectively, "Reaganomics"), the mid-to-late 1980s saw a period of economic growth and stability. The hallmark of Reaganomics was, in part, the wide-scale deregulation of corporate interests, and tax cuts for the wealthy.

Dukakis ran his campaign on a socially liberal platform, and advocated for higher economic regulation and environmental protection. Bush, alternatively, ran on a campaign of continuing the social and economic policies of former President Reagan - which gained him much support with social conservatives and people living in rural areas. Additionally, while the economic programs passed under Reagan, and furthered under Bush and Clinton, may have boosted the economy for a brief period, they are criticized by many analysts as "setting the stage" for economic troubles in the United States after 2007, such as the Great Recession.

Results

See also
 Presidency of George H. W. Bush

References

Hawaii
1988
1988 Hawaii elections